Andreas Vasilios "Akis" Zikos (born 1 June 1974) is a Greek former professional footballer who played as a defensive midfielder. He was a strong and industrious player, known for his tackling and positioning skills. At international level, he represented the Greece national team making 18 appearances between 1996 and 2001. He currently works as an academy manager for A.O. Glyfada.

Club career

Skoda Xanthi
Zikos started his professional career in 1993 with Skoda Xanthi for whom he spent 4 seasons in the Greek Super League.

AEK Athens
In the summer of 1998 Zikos was transferred to AEK Athens for a fee of 130 millon drachmas. He immediately established himself as the team's main defensive midfielder and it didn't take him long to impress with his performances. He was a key player with all the coaches who passed through the team's bench, while he gradually played more and more in the national team. With the transfer of Thodoris Zagorakis to the club in 2000, they formed an amazing partnership in the midfield of the team for two years. Zikos won the Greek Cup in two occasions, 2000 and 2002. In the summer of 2002, not having the best relations with the then administrative leader of the team, Psomiadis, he decided to leave, taking the big step abroad at the same time.

Monaco
In the summer of 2002 he was signed by Monaco where he played for four seasons in Ligue 1. He also proved his talent with the club on the European stage. In 2003, he won the Coupe de la Ligue and in 2004, under Didier Deschamps they made it to the UEFA Champions League Final where they lost to José Mourinho's Porto in Arena AufSchalke, Gelsenkirchen. Despite their heavy loss (3–0 for FC Porto), Zikos was recognized one of the best players on the pitch that day. His appearance in the final made Zikos the first Greek to play in a UEFA Champions League final.

Return to AEK
In 2006, after 4 full successful years in France, Zikos decided to return to his home country to play for his favorite team, AEK Athens. Zikos, in an injury plagued year for AEK Athens, helped the team to finish in second place and achieve a Champions League 3rd qualification round berth. He retired from football on 20 April 2008 on the final game of the regular season.

International career
He won 18 caps for Greece, but fell out of favor when coach Otto Rehhagel took over the team. After helping Monaco to the 2004 UEFA Champions League Final, he was considered for selection in Greece's victorious Euro 2004 squad, however he was ultimately overlooked.

Honours

AEK Athens
Greek Cup: 1999–2000, 2001–02

Monaco
French League Cup: 2003
UEFA Champions League: Runner-up 2003–04

References

External links

Living people
1974 births
Footballers from Athens
Greek footballers
Association football midfielders
Greece international footballers
Greek expatriate footballers
Greek expatriate sportspeople in France
Greek expatriate sportspeople in Monaco
Ligue 1 players
Super League Greece players
AEK Athens F.C. players
AS Monaco FC players
Xanthi F.C. players
Expatriate footballers in France
Expatriate footballers in Monaco
AEK F.C. non-playing staff